For the meaning of videogram relating to audiovisual work or its storage medium, see video.

Videogram is the alter ego of Swedish composer/producer Magnus Sellergren. The originator of the VHS-inspired horror synth sound, the project debuted with the "Charles Bronson" digital single and S/T album in 2014, coinciding with Doc Terror's Italian Horror Week.

Drawing inspiration from various movie genres of the 1980s, Videogram's musical style attempts to capture the era's atmosphere, emulating and celebrating both the electronic music scores of science fiction, action, and horror films as well as the VHS format. Since 2014 the project has received coverage from the international horror community and other pop culture media. Videogram has appeared in interviews with and been featured in The A.V. Club, Bloody Disgusting, Cinema Retro, Lunchmeat VHS, Rue Morgue, Starburst, and Uncovering Stranger Things: Essays on Eighties Nostalgia, Cynicism and Innocence in the Series by author Kevin J. Wetmore Jr.

In 2017 Videogram's music appeared on the Rue Morgue compilation They Came From Rue Morgue and Vestra Pictures documentaries VHS Lives: A Schlockumentary and VHS Lives 2: Undead Format. In 2018 Videogram's "Choice Cuts 2014 - 2018" compilation album and Acid Washed "Voorhees Stomp" remix single was featured in online and mobile platform digital distributor Groupees horror and thriller-themed "The Darkening" bundle that included games by Akupara Games, among others.

Musical Influences
In interviews Magnus Sellergren has stated that Videogram's musical influences include John Carpenter, Fabio Frizzi, Giorgio Moroder, Ennio Morricone, and The Giallos Flame.

Collaborations
Since the project's inception, Videogram has been having an ongoing collaboration with Australian multiinstrumentalist The Jimmy C, with the Australian musician providing drums and percussion for several tracks on a majority of Videogram's releases. Since 2016, Videogram has collaborated with Record Makers duo Acid Washed, whose previous efforts include Moby, Jimmy Somerville, and Wolfmother.

Discography

Albums
Videogram digital (2014), self-released
Pre-Cert LP/CD/digital (2015), Cineploit
Videogram Redux digital (2017), SelectaVision
Choice Cuts 2014 - 2018 CD/digital (2018), SelectaVision

Singles and EPs
Charles Bronson digital (2014), self-released
Camp Blood digital (2014), self-released
2077: Raiders of the Apocalypse lathe-cut 7"/digital (2014), self-released
Cobretti EP digital (2015), self-released
Outpost 31 Isn't Responding digital (2015), self-released
Camp Blood EP 10"/digital (2015), Cineploit
Camp Blood EP cassette (2016), self-released
Gladiatori dell'Apocalisse 12"/digital (2016), Cineploit
Gladiatori dell'Apocalisse cassette (2016), self-released
Halloween digital (2016), self-released
Test Subject 011 digital (2017), SelectaVision
Test Subject 011 7" (2018), SelectaVision
Voorhees Stomp (Acid Washed Remix) digital (2018), self-released
Outpost 31 Isn't Responding cassette/digital (2018), SelectaVision
Michael digital (2018), self-released
Gladiatori dell'Apocalisse (edit) digital (2018), self-released
VHS Lives! Music From the Vestra Pictures Documentary digital (2019), self-released
Papaya digital (2019), self-released

Compilations
Pumpkin Guts Vol: 2 digital (2014), Graveyard Calling Records
Stereo Sonic Electro Rockin digital (2016), Synthetix.FM
Omaggio al Maestro Ennio Morricone LP/CD (2017), Cineploit
They Came From Rue Morgue digital (2017), Rue Morgue magazine
Music For the Murdered digital (2017), Brutal Resonance
Another Year Not Dead digital (2018), Brutal Resonance

Other releases
Videogram VHS cassette (2015), Lunchmeat VHS

Awards and nominations
 "Pre-Cert" LP/CD made part of Code 7 Distribution's 'Best Albums of 2015' series.
 "Test Subject 011" was selected as 7-inch "Vinyl of the Month" by Performer Magazine in April 2018.

Filmography
VHS Lives: A Schlockumentary (2017), Vestra Pictures
VHS Lives 2: Undead Format (2017), Vestra Pictures

Other
Magnus Sellergren is the initiator of the annual grassroots celebration Texas Chain Saw Massacre Day that takes place on August 18.

References

External links
 Official website
 

 

Living people
Swedish male musicians
Dark wave musicians
Swedish electronic musicians
Retro style
Year of birth missing (living people)